Erik von Markovik (born September 24, 1971), more popularly known by his stage name, Mystery, is a Canadian pickup artist and television personality. He is best known for his profiling in Neil Strauss's The Game and his appearances on the VH1 television show The Pickup Artist.

He has been criticized for promoting unethical and manipulative behavior.

Biography
The character Mystery was created by Erik von Markovic in the late 1990s for his performances as a mentalist, titled Natural Magic. He has done magic performances in many places, including Toronto, Las Vegas and Hollywood. The name Mystery was also used by von Markovik as an internet username.

Bibliography
The Venusian Arts Handbook, Mystery Method Corp., 2005 (E-Book)
Revelation (2008). Mystery, Chris Odom, James Matador. Venusian Arts.

References

External links
 

1971 births
Living people
Canadian non-fiction writers
Canadian male non-fiction writers
Pickup artists
Writers from Toronto